Lage Raho Munna Bhai (Hindi: लगे रहो मुन्नाभाई, pronounced) is a 2006 Indian musical comedy directed by Rajkumar Hirani and produced by Vidhu Vinod Chopra. It stars Sanjay Dutt as Munna Bhai, a Mumbai (Bombay) underworld don, who begins to see the spirit of Mahatma Gandhi. Through his interactions with the image of Gandhi, Munna Bhai begins to practice what he calls Gandhigiri (Satyagraha, non-violence, and truth) to help ordinary people solve their problems. His sidekick, Circuit, is portrayed by Arshad Warsi.

Lage Raho Munna Bhai is the  recipient of four National Film Awards in addition to other awards. Some speculated that it would represent India as an entry for the 2007 Academy Award for Best Foreign Film. Although ultimately losing to Rang De Basanti as India's official submission, the film's producers submitted it as an independent entry. However, neither film received an Oscar nomination.

Awards and nominations

Notes

References

Lage Raho Munna Bhai